James Graham Cooper (June 19, 1830 – July 19, 1902) was an American surgeon and naturalist.

Cooper was born in New York. He worked for the California Geological Survey (1860–1874) with Josiah Dwight Whitney, William Henry Brewer and Henry Nicholas Bolander. He was primarily a zoologist, but he also made significant botanical collections from San Diego to Fort Mohave, Arizona in 1861. Cooper was active in the California Academy of Sciences, eventually becoming Director of the Museum.

He obtained his medical degree in 1851 and practiced in New York City until 1853. Spencer F. Baird, the Assistant Secretary of the Smithsonian Institution at that time, helped Cooper work with the Pacific railroad survey parties working in the Washington Territory. He joined this survey under Captain George McClellan as a surgeon until 1854. In 1855 he visited San Francisco and the Panama Isthmus. He collected many birds during this expedition.

In 1860, he returned west and joined the Blake Expedition that went from St. Louis up to the Missouri River and into Idaho and Washington. He worked as a contract surgeon for brief periods with the US Army and Josiah Whitney, the chief of the California Geological Survey. Along with Baird he wrote a book on the birds of California "Ornithology, Volume I, Land Birds" in 1870.

His marriage in 1866 made it difficult for him to balance his interest in natural history. He worked in  San Mateo, Oakland, San Francisco and finally settled in 1875 in Hayward. He wrote on his difficulties in a letter in 1870

His father William Cooper was also a naturalist.

See also
:Category:Taxa named by James Graham Cooper

References

Further reading
Coan, Eugene (1982). James Graham Cooper: Pioneer Western Naturalist. Moscow, Idaho: University of Idaho, Idaho Research Foundation. 255 pp. .

External links
Santa Clara Valley Audubon Society
Digitized and transcribed journal, 1853 - 1854
Digitized and transcribed journal, 1855 - 1856

American naturalists
American surgeons
1830 births
1902 deaths
People associated with the California Academy of Sciences
People from Hayward, California
Scientists from California
19th-century American botanists
19th-century American zoologists